Forest resources in Syria are in need of study and conservation. The wooded area of the country is variously reported as approximately 190,000 hectares (1.0 percent) or 450,000 hectares (2.4 percent).

The principal woodland trees are Pinus brutia, the Turkish pine; Abies cilicica, the Cilician fir; Cedrus libani, the cedar of Lebanon; Cupressus sempervirens, the Mediterranean cypress; Pinus halepensis, the Aleppo pine; Quercus coccifera, the kermes oak; Quercus calliprinos, the Palestine oak; Quercus cerris sp. pseudocerris, the Turkey oak; Quercus infectoria; and Castanea sativa, the common chestnut.

See also
Ajloun Forest Reserve (Jordan, near Syria)
Cedars of God (Lebanon)
Dibeen Forest Reserve (Jordan, near Syria)

References

 
Forestry in Asia